Pike Township is the name of some places in the U.S. state of Pennsylvania:

Pike Township, Berks County, Pennsylvania
Pike Township, Bradford County, Pennsylvania
Pike Township, Clearfield County, Pennsylvania
Pike Township, Potter County, Pennsylvania

Pennsylvania township disambiguation pages